Larry Guinan (born 1938 in Waterford) is an Irish retired sportsperson.  He played hurling with his local club Mount Sion and was a member of the Waterford senior inter-county team in the 1960s.

He first came on the scene in the famous Waterford street leagues when his street, Ard na Gréine, won numerous city titles. A product of St Patrick's CBS in the city he automatically graduated to the Mount Sion club and was an almost instant success. His first glimpse of Croke Park was when he played in the 1957 All-Ireland final against Kilkenny. A teak-hard corner forward he also had plenty of skill and an unerring eye for the goal.

References

 

1938 births
Living people
Mount Sion hurlers
Waterford inter-county hurlers
Munster inter-provincial hurlers
All-Ireland Senior Hurling Championship winners